Caespitotheca is a genus of fungi in the family Erysiphaceae. This is a monotypic genus, containing the single species Caespitotheca forestalis.

References

External links 
 Index Fungorum

Fungal plant pathogens and diseases
Monotypic Leotiomycetes genera